Emmanuel Oshomah (born 5 January 1964) is a Nigerian weightlifter. He competed in the men's middle heavyweight event at the 1984 Summer Olympics.

References

External links
 

1964 births
Living people
Nigerian male weightlifters
Olympic weightlifters of Nigeria
Weightlifters at the 1984 Summer Olympics
Place of birth missing (living people)